The Gaya Line is a railway line of Korail in Busan Metropolitan City, South Korea, connecting Sasang on the Gyeongbu Line with Beom-il on the Donghae Line via Gaya, where the line also connects to the Bujeon Line.

History
The  line was originally opened by the Chosen Government Railway on 10 June 1944 as the Busan Marshalling Yard Line between Sasang and Busanjin; after the end of the Pacific War and the subsequent partition of Korea the line was taken over by the Korean National Railroad, which renamed it Gaya Line on 1 September 1955. On 21 January 1968 the line's terminus was changed from Busanjin to Beom-il.

On 2 December 2002 commuter passenger service on the line was discontinued, and on the 28th electrification and double-tracking of the line was completed.

Route

References

Railway lines in South Korea